The olive-green tyrannulet (Phylloscartes virescens) is a species of bird in the family Tyrannidae, the tyrant flycatchers. It is found in the Guianas of Suriname, French Guiana, and eastern Guyana, with the Essequibo River; also northeast Brazil, in the northeast Amazon Basin of Pará state, and Amapá. Its natural habitat is subtropical or tropical moist lowland forests.

References

External links

olive-green tyrannulet
Birds of the Guianas
olive-green tyrannulet
olive-green tyrannulet
Birds of the Amazon Basin
Birds of Brazil
Taxonomy articles created by Polbot